The Union of Chinese Nationalists, sometimes referred to in English as the Chinese Pan-Blue Alliance, or China Pan-Blue Alliance, abbreviated as "UOCN", is an unregistered political group in the People's Republic of China that supports the goals of the Kuomintang and the ideals of the Pan-Blue Coalition in the Republic of China on Taiwan. According to the website, it values liberal democracy and the Three Principles of the People, and opposes communism and Taiwan independence. It originated in an internet forum in August 2004.

UOCN is not officially recognized by the PRC government. The actual membership size and level of support for the organization is difficult to gauge because it is actively suppressed in the PRC.

In a news conference held in 2007, Yang Yi, spokesman of PRC's Taiwan Affairs Office, declared the organization to be "unregistered and illegal", and "not being related to the Nationalist Party of China Kuomintang in Taiwan".

See also 
List of political parties in the People's Republic of China
Weiquan movement
Political status of Taiwan
One Country on Each Side

References

External links
 Union of Chinese Nationalists official website

Banned political parties in China
Chinese dissidents
Politics of China
Kuomintang
Chinese nationalist political parties